Zeynep Nihal Yeğinobalı (16 November 1927 - 14 March 2020) was a Turkish novelist and translator.

Private life
Zeynep Nihal  was born in Manisa on 16 November 1927. She moved to Istanbul when she was eight years old. Following the primary school, 
she attended American College for Girls (ACG45), and upon graduation in 1945, went to the United States to study literature in the State University of New York. After living eight years in the United States,  she returned to Turkey.

Yeğinobalı died in Istanbul at the age of 92 on 14 March 2020.

Career
She used the pen names "Süreyya Sarıca" and"Vincent Ewing". She was a young woman when she published her first translation of the 1904 novel The Garden of Allah by Robert Hichens (18641950) into Allah’ın Bahçesi in 1946, and her first novel Genç Kızlar ("Young Girls") in 1950, which was an example of fictitious translation by her pen name "Vincent Ewing".

She translated many classical and contemporary works of writers, including Laurence Sterne (713–1768), Jane Austen (1775–1817), Charlotte Brontë (1816–1855), W.M. Thackeray (1811–1863), Charles Dickens (1812–1870), Thomas Hardy  (1840–1928), Lewis Carroll (1832–1898), Oscar Wilde ,(1854–1900), Mark Twain (1835–1910), J. M. Barrie (1860–1937), D. H. Lawrence (1885–1930), L. Frank Baum (1856–1919), John Steinbeck (1902–1968), Pearl S. Buck (1892–1973), Mikhail Sholokhov (905–1984), Carlos Fuentes ( 1928–2012), Isabel Allende (born 1942), Eduardo Galeano (1940–2015), Patrick White (1912–1990), Iris Murdoch (1919–1999) and D. M. Thomas (born 1935).

Her writings and translations were also published in periodicals like Hafta, 100 Roman, Yıldız, Hayat and Akbaba. She must have been a forceful personality —not many girls of her age would have been able to talk a publishing company into printing her translation of a new and exciting book by an American writer, a writer, who never existed. Yeginobali, a keen young writer at the time, wanted to write a novel about life at a girls’ college, but was tired of being turned down by publishing companies, which kept telling her that she was too young to be a writer. She also felt that the eroticism in her writing might be an overdose for readers of the time, especially coming from a young woman like herself. Aware that translated novels were much more in demand than work by new Turkish writers, she plotted, and convinced a publishing company to expect a chapter of translation (!) from Vincent Ewing’s book each week.

The book hit the bestseller list in no time. Though Yeğinobalı was initially planning to reveal her identity, after the book came out to so much attention, she decided to keep at her game, and enjoy the commentaries from her hidden corner.

Finally, in 2004, to coincide with a reprint of the novel by Can Publishing, Yeğinobalı decided that the time had come to add on her own name next to that of Vincent Ewing’s. The book’s new issue is among the publisher’s bestseller novels. She recently wrote her memoirs, Cumhuriyet Çocuğu ("The Republic’s Child"), published by Can Yayınları in 2005. Spanning the first ten years of her life, Yeğinobalı’s memoirs provide the reader with a vivid picture of life in a small Anatolian town during the very first years of the Republic. Filmmakers are currently interested in her two other novels Mazi Kalbimde bir Yaradır (1988), and Sitem (1998), which suggest subtle readings of suppressed sexuality in Turkish society.

Works

Own works
Her  major works are:

Novels

 Eflatun Kız 1964 (Novel)

Memiors

Translations
Some of her translations are:

References

Sources
 "Graduates in the News." RC Quarterly 23 (2004): 18.
 "Nihal Yeğinobalı." Imge Kitapevi. 2004. 9 May 2007 .

1927 births
2020 deaths
People from Manisa
Alumni of Arnavutköy American High School for Girls
State University of New York alumni
Turkish translators
Turkish women novelists